This is a list of statistics for the 2019 Cricket World Cup. Each list contains the top five records (including ties for fifth place), except for the partnership records.

Team statistics

Highest team totals

Largest winning margin

By runs

By wickets

By balls remaining

Lowest team totals
This is a list of completed innings only, low totals in matches with reduced overs are omitted except when the team was all out. Successful run chases in the second innings are not counted.

Smallest winning margin

By runs

Note: England won the final of the tournament based on the total number of boundaries scored, after the scores finished level in both the match and the resulting Super over.

By wickets

By balls remaining

Batting Statistics

Most runs

Highest scores

Most boundaries 

Note: For Full list of Boundaries and Sixes hit see Boundary Trackers

Most ducks 
11 players all had two ducks, with Nuwan Pradeep of Sri Lanka and Shoaib Malik of Pakistan doing so in the fewest total innings (three).

Bowling Statistics

Most wickets

Best bowling figures

Most maidens

Most dot balls

Hat-tricks

Fielding Statistics

Most dismissals 
This is a list of wicket-keepers with the most dismissals in the tournament.

Most catches 
This is a list of the fielders who took the most catches in the tournament; catches made as wicket-keeper are not included.

Other statistics

Highest partnerships 
The following tables are lists of the highest partnerships for the tournament.

By wicket

By runs

Tied match
2019 Cricket World cup saw the final match as the fifth tied match in the history of the tournament ensuring that this was the fifth world cup with a tied game (1999 Cricket World Cup – Semifinals between Australia and South Africa, 2003 Cricket World Cup – Group B match between South Africa and Sri Lanka, 2007 Cricket World Cup – Group D match between Ireland and Zimbabwe, and 2011 Cricket World Cup – Group B match between India and England). The tie-breaking super over was also tied, England won the match and title by superior boundary count.

References

External links
Official 2019 World Cup site 
Cricket World Cup at icc-cricket.com 
ESPN cricinfo

Cricket World Cup statistics
statistics